Theodore Wright (1883–1914) was a British soldier and recipient of the Victoria Cross.

Theodore Wright may also refer to:
 Theodore S. Wright (1797–1847), African-American abolitionist
 Theodore Paul Wright (1895–1970), American aeronautical engineer
 Ted A. Wright (1901–1974), American football, basketball, and track coach

See also
 Ted Wright, American football player for the Boston Redskins and Brooklyn Dodgers